
Gmina Rąbino is a rural gmina (administrative district) in Świdwin County, West Pomeranian Voivodeship, in north-western Poland.

Villages
Gmina Rąbino contains the villages and settlements of Batyń, Biała Góra, Biernów, Dąbrowa Białogardzka, Dąbrówka, Dołganów, Gąsków, Głodzino, Gręzino, Jezierzyce, Kłodzino, Kołatka, Lipie, Liskowo, Modrzewiec, Niebórz, Nielep, Paszęcin, Polakowo, Rąbinko, Rąbino, Racimierz, Role, Rzecino, Stare Ludzicko, Świerznica and Zbytki.

Neighbouring gminas
Gmina Rąbino is bordered by the gminas of Białogard, Połczyn-Zdrój, Sławoborze and Świdwin.

References
Polish official population figures 2006

Rabino
Świdwin County